The National Opera House, formerly the Wexford Opera House, is a theatre in Wexford, Ireland. It was officially opened on 5 September 2008 in a ceremony with An Taoiseach Brian Cowen, followed by a live broadcast of RTÉ's The Late Late Show from the O'Reilly Theatre.

It was built on the site of the former Theatre Royal, Wexford, which was demolished to facilitate the development, the need for a new opera house was a result of the success of the Wexford Festival Opera and the provision of a theatre, concert and conference venue in Wexford.

The Opera House consists of the 771 seat O'Reilly Theatre and the smaller Jerome Hynes Theatre, seating up to 176. It was designed and built by the architect Keith Williams Architects with the Office of Public Works.

The Opera House was used for 2014 Sinn Féin Ard Fheis.

The building was officially renamed as Ireland's National Opera House by the Minister for Arts, Heritage, Regional, Rural and Gaeltacht Affairs, Heather Humphreys, at the opening of the 2014 Wexford Festival.

References

External links
 Wexford Opera Festival official website
National Opera House official website
 Wexford Light Opera Society official website

Buildings and structures in County Wexford
Music venues completed in 2008
Opera houses in the Republic of Ireland
Theatres completed in 2008
Wexford Festival Opera
Recipients of Civic Trust Awards
21st-century architecture in the Republic of Ireland